Subcancilla sulcata is a species of sea snail, a marine gastropod mollusk in the family Mitridae, the miters or miter snails.

Description
The species was first described by William Swainson as Mitra sulcata. The shell is marked by very distinct ridges aligned with the whorls.

Distribution
The type specimen was obtained from the Pacific coast of the American Isthmus.

References

External links

Mitridae
Gastropods described in 1825